Paul-Ausserleitner-Schanze ("Paul Ausserleitner Hill") was opened in 1947 as "Hochkönigsschanze", and re-built in 2004, and is a ski jumping venue in Bischofshofen, Austria. It is one of the more important venues in the FIS Ski jumping World Cup, annually hosting the fourth and final competition of the prestigious Four Hills Tournament. It was renamed after Paul Ausserleitner, an Austrian ski jumper who died of the consequences of a fall on this hill in January 1952.

History 
The first major competition on the hill was the pre-tournament for the 1948 Winter Olympics. The hill was renovated in 1991 and again before the FIS Nordic World Ski Championships 1999, during which it was the venue for the ski jumping competitions from a large hill. In 2004 the hill was renovated again and prepared for summer ski jumping events.

References

St. Johann im Pongau District
Ski jumping venues in Austria
Four Hills Tournament
Salzburg Slate Alps
Sports venues in Salzburg (state)
1947 establishments in Austria
Sports venues completed in 1947